Ibtissam Bouharat (born 2 January 1990) is a footballer who plays as a midfielder for KV Malines. Born in Belgium, she represents the Morocco women's national team.

Career 
Bouharat started her career with Dilbeek Sport. In 2005 she traveled to Brussels to join RSC Anderlecht and began her professional career, from there. She moved again in the summer of 2006 to KV Mechelen. In three years at Mechelen, Bouharat did not go beyond sitting on the bench as a reserve player. That caused her to take a different direction to join a new club, DVK Haacht. In the summer of 2010, she stopped playing in the Tweede Klasse and went for a year to play for Eva's Tienen. On 25 May 2011 she starred with Romelu Lukaku, Vadis Odjidja, Faris Haroun and François Kompany in a charity match against Racism. She played until 30 June 2011 in Tienen and then joined the women's football division of Lierse SK. Since 20 May 2012 she is under contract with Standard Liège. After Bouharat scored in 13 games and 2 goals for Standard Feminina, she left Liège and moved to RSC Anderlecht in Brussels.

See also
List of Morocco women's international footballers

References 

1990 births
Living people
Moroccan women's footballers
Women's association football defenders
Morocco women's international footballers
People from Berchem
Belgian women's footballers
Belgian sportspeople of Moroccan descent
Standard Liège (women) players
RSC Anderlecht (women) players
PSV (women) players